Neopecoelina is a genus of trematodes in the family Opecoelidae.

Species
Neopecoelina cavasiusi (Gupta, 1955) Yamaguti, 1958
Neopecoelina saharanpurensis Gupta, 1955

References

Opecoelidae
Plagiorchiida genera